Billbergia is a genus of flowering plants in the family Bromeliaceae, subfamily Bromelioideae.

Description
The Billbergia species are rosette-forming, evergreen perennials, usually epiphytic, occasionally terrestrial or lithotypic in habit. They are mostly medium-sized species with small funnel diameters. Most species are epiphytes, some species grow on plants, on rocks, as well as directly on the ground. Water collects in the leaf funnels. In many funnels there are small biotopes with several species of animals and algae and aquatic plants. The rough leaves are always reinforced on the edge (as with all genera of the Bromelioideae), with a spiked tip. In some species and varieties, the leaves are beautifully colored. In many species, suction scales are everywhere on the leaves, often also on the inflorescence.

They often bloom with brilliantly colored flowers with long-lasting inflorescence (inflorescences). The inflorescence often hang with terminal scape, erect or decurved. Strikingly colored bracts (bracts) often sit on the inflorescence; the color red dominates (usually with a blue component).

Flowers bisexual, sessile or conspicuously pedicellate; sepals free; petals free, threefold with a double perianth, with basal appendages, often spirally recurved at anthesis; stamens free or adnate to the petals, the anthers without appendages; inferior ovary . There are three sepals present. The three petals often have different shades of blue, there are also yellow, green and white. Birds are the pollinators of the blue-flowered species. An important characteristic that distinguishes them from other genera is that their petals curl up when they wither. The individual flowers only bloom for a few hours and can be pollinated for much less time. Most species have small scales (Ligulea) at the base of the petals. The six stamens and the style often protrude far from the flower. The ovary are under constant. A large part of the species blooms at night.
The flower formula is:  bis 

The fruits are multi-seeded berries are often heavily colored when ripe; red to blue dominate here. The fruits are eaten by animals (mainly by birds, less often by bats and monkeys). The seeds are excreted undigested and end up on branches with the feces.

Taxonomy
The Swedish botanist Carl Peter Thunberg (1743-1828) established the genus Billbergia in Plantarum Brasiliensium ..., 3, 1821 p. 30 with the type species being Billbergia speciosa. The genus, named for the Swedish botanist, zoologist, and anatomist Gustaf Johan Billberg (1772-1844), is divided into two subgenera: Billbergia and Helicodea. Species in subgenus Helicodea are distinguishable by the tightly recurved 'clock spring' flower petals, unlike other billbergias where the petals are flared.

Species

Distribution

References

External links

 
Bromeliaceae genera